Helen Stern Richards (1917–1983) was an American Theater Press Agent and Manager.

Life and career
Born in Wichita Falls, Texas, Richards was a graduate of the University of Texas. After graduation, she became assistant to the manager of a Texas radio station, where she ran her own daily radio program for women. From 1939 to 1944, Richards was co-owner and manager of a small theater in Oklahoma City.

Following her move to New York City, she worked with the composer Sigmund Romberg. She subsequently began work as a press agent for Broadway productions, handling the press for Don Juan in Hell, New Girl in Town, and the original production of West Side Story.

Following her 1983 death, Richards' collected papers were donated to the New York Public Library for the Performing Arts' Billy Rose Theatre Division.

Her son is Tony Award-winning theater producer Jeffrey Richards.

References

External links
 

People from Texas
1917 births
1983 deaths
American theatre managers and producers